Jorge Azkoitia Gabiola (born 27 April 1974) is a Spanish retired footballer who played as a defensive midfielder.

Club career
Born in Bilbao, Biscay, Azkoitia started playing professionally with local Sestao Sport Club in the third division, but eventually helped to the club's promotion to the second level. However, the team were relegated in 1996, and he signed with Basque neighbours Deportivo Alavés.

At Alavés, Azkoitia proved essential in the 1997–98 season, appearing in 39 matches and scoring three goals in an eventual La Liga return after a four-decade absence. He was relatively used in the following years, but had few opportunities in the 2000–01 campaign as the side achieved an historical runner-up position in the UEFA Cup.

Afterwards, Azkoitia joined Rayo Vallecano, being scarcely played in his first season. He was an important first-team element in the next two, but the Madrilenians dropped two consecutive divisions and he was sent off a combined four times.

Subsequently, Azkoitia served second division spells with Elche CF and SD Eibar – in 2005–06 he netted a career-best 11 goals, but suffered relegation with the latter. He then moved to Alicante CF for the following season, helping to a 2008 promotion to the second tier.

In the 2008–09 campaign, Azkoitia was once again instrumental for Alicante by scoring nine times in 33 league games, but the Valencians were immediately relegated. He retired from football at the age of 35, with professional totals of 310 matches and 39 goals.

References

External links

1974 births
Living people
Spanish footballers
Footballers from Bilbao
Association football midfielders
La Liga players
Segunda División players
Segunda División B players
Sestao Sport Club footballers
Deportivo Alavés players
Rayo Vallecano players
Elche CF players
SD Eibar footballers
Alicante CF footballers